Sho, Shō or SHO may refer to:

Music
 Shō (instrument) (笙), a Japanese wind instrument
 Kane (instrument) (鉦), a Japanese percussion instrument
 Sho?, a Dubai rock band

People
 Shō (given name), including Sho
 Shō (surname)
 Sho (wrestler) (born 1989), Japanese wrestler

Transportation
 Ford Taurus SHO (Super High Output) car
 Ford SHO V6 engine
 Ford SHO V8 engine
 King Mswati III International Airport (IATA code), Eswatini 
 Sokcho Airport (former IATA code), South Korea

Other uses
 Sho (board game), Tibet
 Sho (letter), for the Bactrian language
 Shō (unit) (升), a Japanese unit of volume
 Shō River, Japan
 Regulation SHO
 Senior house officer, in hospitals in Ireland
 Showtime (TV network)
 Shutout, in team games
 Station house officer, of a police station in India and Pakistan
 VV SHO, a Dutch soccer club
 An historical currency of Tibet

See also
 
 Shodō, Japanese calligraphy